St Edmund's School is an independent day and boarding school in Canterbury, England.

St Edmund's School may also refer to:

England
 St Edmund's School, Hindhead, Surrey
 St Edmund's School, Ipswich (disambiguation)
 St Edmund's Catholic School, Dover
 St Edmund's Catholic School, Portsmouth
 St Edmund's Girls' School, Salisbury
 St Edmund's RC Primary School, Edmonton, North London

United States
 St. Edmund Preparatory High School (Brooklyn), New York

See also
 St. Edmund's College (disambiguation)
 St Edmund's Catholic Academy